Derland Paul Moore (October 7, 1951 – September 24, 2020) was an American professional football player who was a defensive lineman in the National Football League (NFL) for the New Orleans Saints and the New York Jets.  An All-American, he played college football at the University of Oklahoma and was selected in the second round of the 1973 NFL Draft. At the time he was drafted, Moore was the highest selected college walk-on in history of the NFL Draft, a distinction overtaken by fellow Oklahoma Sooner Baker Mayfield, the overall number one draft pick in 2018.  Moore went on to set a team record for service with 169 games played in 13 seasons with the New Orleans Saints, playing for five permanent head coaches and three interim coaches in that time.

He led the team in sacks in 1980, and was selected to the Pro Bowl in 1983. Moore retired from the NFL in 1986 and was later inducted into the New Orleans Saints Hall of Fame, the New Orleans Saints 40th and 50th Anniversary Team, the Missouri Sports Hall of Fame, and was named as one of the Top 100 Sooners in Oklahoma University football history.

Moore died on September 24, 2020, age 68, from a lengthy illness.

References

1951 births
2020 deaths
People from Malden, Missouri
Players of American football from Missouri
American football defensive tackles
Oklahoma Sooners football players
New Orleans Saints players
New York Jets players
Ed Block Courage Award recipients